The fragment molecular orbital method (FMO) is a computational method that can compute very large molecular systems with thousands of atoms using ab initio quantum-chemical wave functions.

History of FMO and related methods 

The fragment molecular orbital method (FMO) was developed by K. Kitaura and coworkers in 1999. FMO is deeply interconnected with the energy decomposition analysis (EDA) by Kitaura and Morokuma, developed in 1976. The main use of FMO is to compute very large molecular systems by dividing them into fragments and performing ab initio or density functional quantum-mechanical calculations of fragments and their dimers, whereby the Coulomb field from the whole system is included. The latter feature allows fragment calculations without using caps.

The mutually consistent field (MCF) method  had introduced the idea of self-consistent fragment calculations in their embedding potential, which was later used with some modifications in various methods including FMO. There had been other methods related to FMO including the incremental correlation method by H. Stoll (1992).

Later, other methods closely related to FMO were proposed including the kernel energy method of L. Huang and the electrostatically embedded many-body expansion by E. Dahlke,
S. Hirata and later M. Kamiya suggested approaches also very closely related to FMO. Effective fragment molecular orbital (EFMO) method combines some features of the effective fragment potentials (EFP) and FMO. A detailed perspective on the fragment-based method development can be found in a recent review.

Introduction to FMO 

In addition to the calculation of the total properties, such as the energy,
energy gradient, dipole moment etc., the pair interaction is obtained for
each pair of fragments. This pair interaction energy can be further
decomposed into electrostatic, exchange, charge transfer and dispersion
contributions. This analysis is known as the pair interaction energy
decomposition analysis (PIEDA) and it can be thought of as FMO-based EDA.
Alternatively, configuration analysis for fragment interaction (CAFI) and fragment interaction analysis based on local MP2 (FILM) were suggested within the FMO framework.

In FMO, various wave functions can be used for ab initio calculations of fragments and their dimers, such as Hartree–Fock, Density functional theory (DFT), Multi-configurational self-consistent field (MCSCF), time-dependent DFT (TDDFT), configuration interaction (CI), second order Møller–Plesset perturbation theory (MP2), and coupled cluster (CC). The solvent effects can be treated with the Polarizable continuum model (PCM). The FMO code is very efficiently parallelized utilising the generalized distributed data interface (GDDI) and hundreds of CPUs can be used with nearly perfect scaling.

In the FMO book published in 2009, one can find 10 illustrated chapters written by the experts in the FMO development and applications, as well as a CDROM with
annotated samples of input and output files, Facio modelling software and video tutorials (AppliGuide movies, showing mouse clicks) for treating difficult PDB files with Facio. In addition to this book, there are several chapters published in other books.

There are three general reviews of FMO published.

In 2013-2014, a Japanese journal, CICSJ Bulletin, published a series of FMO papers in Japanese (about 100 pages in total), which give a representative summary of the recent FMO development and applications done in Japan, including papers on the GAMESS/FMO interface in Facio and developing an OpenMP version of GAMESS/FMO on the K computer.

The largest system size computed with FMO so far is a slab of fullerite surface, containing 1,030,440 atoms, whose geometry was fully optimized using FMO-DFTB recently implemented in GAMESS.

Applications of FMO 

There are two main application fields of FMO: biochemistry and molecular dynamics of chemical reactions in solution. In addition, there is an emerging field of inorganic applications. 
 
In 2005, an application of FMO to the calculation of the ground electronic state of photosynthetic protein with more than 20,000 atoms was distinguished with the best technical paper award at Supercomputing 2005.
A number of applications of FMO to biochemical problems has been published, for instance, to Drug design , quantitative structure-activity relationship (QSAR) as well as the studies of excited states and chemical reactions of biological systems. In the recent development (2008), the adaptive frozen orbital (AFO) treatment of the detached bonds was suggested for FMO, making it possible to study solids, surfaces and nano systems, such as silicon nanowrires. FMO-TDDFT was also applied to the excited states of molecular crystals (quinacridone).

Among inorganic systems, silica-related materials (zeolites, mesoporous nanoparticles and silica surfaces) were studied with FMO,
as well as ionic liquids and boron nitride ribbons.

Software for FMO 
The FMO method is implemented in GAMESS (US), ABINIT-MP and PAICS software packages, distributed free of charge.

In the earlier stage, the preparation of the GAMESS input files was facilitated with the FMOutil software. Later, various parts of FMOutil were
incorporated in the new graphical user interface called fu. 
Fu is a general open-source GUI not limited to FMO or GAMESS. It is written mainly in Python and some critical modules
are in FORTRAN. Fu is distributed under BSD license so anybody can modify it and redistributed freely.  
In addition, another graphical user interface Facio developed by M. Suenaga has a very convenient specialised support of FMO (in addition to other features), with which an automatic fragmentation of molecular clusters, proteins, nucleotides, saccharides and any combination thereof (e.g., DNA and protein complexes in explicit solvent) can be done in a few minutes, and a manual fragmentation of solids and surfaces can be accomplished by clicking the bonds to be detached. Facio can also visualise results of FMO calculations, such as the pair interactions.

FMO implementation in GAMESS 
(E - energy, G - gradient, H - Hessian; e, g and h - respectively the same, but in the development version soon to be released; bold - can be used with PCM)

See also
 GAMESS (US)

References

External links 
 FMO Homepage
 GAMESS-US Homepage
 ABINIT-MP Homepage
 PAICS Homepage

Computational chemistry
Molecular biology